Kanepokhari Rural Municipality is a Gaunpalika (rural municipality) located in the center of Morang District, Province No. 1, Nepal.

It is very beautiful place.

Location
The Bayarban, Keroun and Hoklabari Village development committees were consolidated to form the Kanepokhari Gaupalika in March 2017. 
The population as of 2017 was 38,033. The current VDC Office of Bayarban is the office of this Gaupalika.

The name comes from the Kanepokhari pond which has shape of kan which translates to ear in English, it is a site of cultural importance.

Population

According to the 2011 population census, Kanepokhari Rural Municipality had a total population of 38,033, of which 17,487 were male and 20,546 female.
There were 8,683 households.
The ratio of males to females was 0.85.
5,013 of the population were absent from their households, or 13.18% of the population. 
The absent people were 4,293 male (24.55% of total) and 720 female (3.5% of total).

Facilities

There are three Banks in this Gaupalika all Located in Kanepokhari Ward 6, Ramailo:
 Miteri Development Bank Limited.
NIC ASIA Bank Limited.
Rastriya Banijya Bank Ltd.(Almost Set to open)

The Gaupalika functional Office is Located in Kanepokhari-6, Ramailo.

Along with bank and hospital this rural munacipality is facilated with public and private school. Mount Hermon children Academy is the best school of this area.

Wards

There are seven Gram/Nagar Palika wards:

References

 
Rural municipalities of Nepal established in 2017
Rural municipalities in Koshi Province
Rural municipalities in Morang District